Embry may refer to:

People 
Aaron Embry (born 1975), American musician
Ashton F. Embry (born 1946), Canadian research scientist
Basil Embry (1902–1977), British air force commander
C. B. Embry (1941-2022), American politician
Eric Embry (born 1959), American wrestler
Ethan Embry (born 1978), American actor
T. Higbee Embry (1897–1946), American aviator
James Kenneth Embry, Jr. (died 2014), died after hunger strike in Kentucky State Penitentiary
Norris Embry (1921–1981), American artist
Paddy Embry (born 1942), Australian politician
Wayne Embry (born 1937), American basketball player
Embry Lopez (born 1980), American Photographer

Places
Embry, Pas-de-Calais, a commune in northern France
Embry, Mississippi, an unincorporated community, United States

Other uses
Embry–Riddle Aeronautical University (ERAU)
Embry Call, fictional character in the Twilight novels by Stephenie Meyer
Don Embry, fictional character in the television series Big Love